Max Payne is a fictional character and the playable protagonist of the neo-noir video game series of the same name. Max was introduced in the 2001 third-person shooter Max Payne, which was written by Sam Lake and developed by Remedy Entertainment. The game's publisher, 3D Realms, intended Max to serve as the "foundation of a new gaming franchise". In the first game, the character was portrayed by Lake, with Timothy Gibbs and James McCaffrey later taking over the role, and consistently voiced by McCaffrey. Mark Wahlberg portrayed Max in the 2008 film adaptation of the series. The first and third game in the series present the story as retold by Max from his point of view, while the second game alternates between his and that of the femme fatale character Mona Sax.

In the original Max Payne, Max is an NYPD police detective and an undercover special agent for the DEA. Max becomes a vigilante following the murder of his family and, later, the murder of his police partner, for which he was framed. In the second game, Max Payne 2: The Fall of Max Payne, he returns to the department as a detective and must solve a conspiracy filled with death and betrayal, which has a deep effect on his personal life. At the start of Max Payne 3, which was developed by Rockstar Games, Max finds himself employed as a bodyguard for Rodrigo Branco, a wealthy businessman in São Paulo, Brazil, but is soon drawn into another conspiracy. The character has been well-received by media.

Character development

In the creation of Max Payne, the publisher 3D Realms "wanted to develop another strong character that would be the foundation for a new gaming franchise, much like we [3D Realms] had done with Duke Nukem." The titular character of Max Payne was originally named Max Heat, and 3D Realms spent over $20,000 worldwide trademarking this name before someone at the company suggested the last name Payne, which was immediately adopted. He was modeled after Sam Lake (Sami Järvi), who wrote the game's story and script for the Finnish company Remedy Entertainment. Lake also dressed up and played this role for the graphic novel-style cutscenes. For Max Payne 2: The Fall of Max Payne, however, Lake declined the role. Due to having a much larger budget this time, the developers were able to hire professional actors, choosing Timothy Gibbs to be the new model for Max.

In both games, Max's voice actor was James McCaffrey. McCaffrey recalled: "Originally, I’d worked on a show called Swift Justice, and there were some similarities between the two characters in terms of them both having experienced some family tragedy and were familiar with the concept of vengeance, but there weren't any specific characters that Max is based on." In an early announcement from Rockstar Games (the franchise's new developer and publisher), Max's voice actor was to be recast with an older actor. In the end, however, McCaffrey did return to the role of Max in Max Payne 3, for which he also provided the motion capture material. McCaffrey said that performing motion capture helped match the dialogue to the scenes and compared it to "having to act in Avatar."
Payne's look changed significantly for the third game, featuring an older, bald and bearded Max; this move received overwhelmingly negative reactions. In response, Rockstar Games made changes to the game, as Max's appearance shifts over the course of the game, including his 'classic' appearance during flashbacks of his time in New Jersey. According to Rockstar's Sam Houser, "This is Max as we've never seen him before, a few years older, more world-weary and cynical than ever." McCaffrey compared Max in the third game to Charles Bronson's character Paul Kersey in the film Death Wish.

Attributes
Max Payne has been put into a fatalist situation against his will, in the style of a classic element of many noir films, the fall guy. Max is an antihero, as he himself states: "I was not one of them, I was no hero." The character is noted for his complex use of both metaphors and wordplay to describe the world around him within his inner monologues, which often contradict his external responses to characters he speaks with. He is an extreme introvert and his life is largely illustrated through dramatic and often morbidly cynical soliloquies describing his feelings about his actions and situation. It is also hinted through the games that Max has a questionable grip on reality.

At the beginning of the first game, Max is seen differently as a smiling, happily married extrovert with a bright personality. However, after his family is murdered, Max loses his meaning of life and blindly works toward his only remaining purpose: vengeance. However, he has not nullified his feelings, as he is taken with the femme fatale contract killer Mona Sax when they first meet, and befriends the Russian mobster Vladimir Lem. All the while, Max shows signs of survivor's guilt and self-destructive behaviour, considering his life to have ended "in a New York minute". At the end of the second game, he finally seems to find peace within himself, saying: "I had a dream of my wife. She was dead. But it was alright." However, this is not the case in Max Payne 3 as in the opening cinematic, the drunk Max angrily throws a portrait of what is implied to be his family against his apartment wall. He regrets this act and picks up the picture.

Rockstar vice-president Dan Houser described Max Payne in the third game as "a drunk, somewhat morose, widowed ex-cop, trying to find some kind of peace with himself. [...] A man who has spent his life killing, even in the service of his idea of what is right or wrong, is going to be extremely damaged. [...] He wants to be a thinker but he's much better as a doer. When he thinks, he gets wrapped up in himself or makes mistakes. When he acts, he is brilliant, almost super human. That is his character, and the dichotomy between the two is the reality of his life and at the heart of the game. He cannot seem to move forward emotionally, but physically, he is relentless." Max is shown to be quite aware of his shortcomings and flaws, stating: "I'm not slipping. I'm slipped. I'm a bad joke." Max Payne 3 has him display not only extreme violence but also more restraint than in the previous games.

Appearances

In video games

In the original game, spanning the period of three years between 1998 and 2001, Max Payne (voiced by James McCaffrey) is a former New York City Police Department (NYPD) homicide detective whose wife Michelle and six-month-old daughter Rose were brutally murdered in a home invasion connected with the investigation of a new street drug known as Valkyr. Enraged, Max joined the Drug Enforcement Administration (DEA) as a secret agent and went undercover in the Mafia. Eventually, framed for the murder of his NYPD and DEA partner Alex Balder, and with his identity exposed, Max becomes a fugitive wanted by the Mafia and the police alike while waging his personal war on the crime. Eventually, he discovers and seemingly destroys a powerful conspiracy behind all these events.

After solving the Valkyr case and avenging his family, Max is cleared by his contact in the powerful secret society known as the Inner Circle, and returns to the NYPD. In the first sequel, taking place in 2003, Max begins investigating a series of murders by a shadowy group of professional killers called the Cleaners. Soon, Max reunites with the murder suspect Mona Sax to solve the mysteries of the Inner Circle; the investigation leads to Mona's death.

Nine years after the events of the second game, Max has retired from the force and is living in New Jersey, now addicted to alcohol and painkillers. After a violent mob confrontation, he is forced to flee for the unfamiliar streets of São Paulo, Brazil. Max gets a job working in a security detail for Rodrigo Branco, a wealthy businessman along with Raul Passos who went through police training with Max. After Rodrigo's wife is kidnapped, Max and Raul discover and then destroy a human organ harvesting ring involving local street gangs, right-wing paramilitary mercenaries and a corrupt Brazilian special police force.

In film

In the film adaptation, loosely based on the plot of the first game, Max Payne (played by Mark Wahlberg) is a NYPD cop seeking revenge against his family's killers. When Mark Wahlberg first read Beau Thorne's script he thought it was "awesome" but became wary after finding out it was based on a video game. Describing his role, Wahlberg said: "It's probably one of the edgier roles I've played but also the most layered. Here's a very happy guy who worked a dismal job, had a beautiful family. But the beauty in his life was taken away. He just goes on a rampage. It's all driven by emotion." 3D Realms' Scott Miller, however, said Max Payne was poorly portrayed in the film, falling short of the game's standards.

Other appearances
A three-issue Max Payne 3 tie-in digital comic, created and released in partnership between Rockstar Games and Marvel Comics explores Max's early years and the events prior to the third game in the series. Max was born to Helen and Jack Payne. Max's father was a PTSD-suffering Vietnam veteran who cheated on and sometimes beat his wife. An important influence on the boy was his maternal grandfather; a college professor who would tell him stories of ancient mythology. Helen died in 1976, possibly due to her alcoholism; Jack's death followed three years later. As a young man, Max graduated from the New York City Police Academy as the top trainee in his class. Several years later, he met his future wife Michelle while saving her from two robbers. They married six months later and their daughter, Rose, was born on February 4, 1998.

In 2012, several sets of Max Payne's Xbox Live Avatar clothes from the original game were released by Rockstar on the Xbox Live Marketplace. Max Payne 3 Special Edition was bundled with a 10" tall collectible Max Payne statue made by TriForce. According to an Easter egg in Remedy Entertainment's Alan Wake, Max died in 2016, thirteen years after the events of Max Payne 2. However, this is not canonical, as the rights to the series have moved to Rockstar Games. In Rockstar's 2013 video game Grand Theft Auto V, players can customize one of the protagonists, Michael De Santa, to look like Max in Max Payne 3.

Reception

Max Payne was named the year's best game character by Eurogamer in 2001. In 2008, PC Zone ranked him as PC gaming's seventh-best character, commenting: "He might be a film noir cliché, but Max Payne is a relatively unique specimen in games, with a superb script and suitably smooth voice acting to match." Game Informer included him on their list of game characters that "shaped the 2000s," as chosen by the staff and readers alike. In 2011, readers of Guinness World Records voted Max as the 42nd-top video game character of all time. In 2012, GamesRadar ranked him as the 23rd on their list of the "100 best heroes in video games", saying that while he had the worst luck on the planet, "he managed to maintain his sanity and prevail".

Gulf News ranked him as second on their 2011 list of top video game characters, adding that "his no-nonsense, take-no-prisoners attitude won him legions of fans." That same year, 360 ranked his name as fifth on their list of the top "manliest" character names on Xbox 360. IGN featured Max prominently in their 2012 article "A History of Badasses," ranked him as gaming's "most notorious" antihero that same year, and called him "one of video games' most troubled characters." That same year, GamesRadar included Max among the "13 unluckiest bastards in gaming," stating that "it’s hard to think of a protagonist who gets shit on more relentlessly than Max Payne" and noting him for having "the most comically overwrought internal monologues ever to appear in a game." In 2013, Complex ranked him as the 42nd "most badass" video game character of all time.

Max's relationship with Mona Sax was considered to be one of the most "disastrous game romances" by GamesRadar in 2011. The sex scene between Max and Mona was described by Games.net as "one of the most fitting ever seen in a video game," considering it to lack the gratuitousness that most sex scenes in video games exhibit.

In 2013, Complex included Max Payne at the number-two spot on their list of "old school" video game characters who were style icons, as "the gritty, hard-boiled NYC cop look was a perfect fit." The character's initial design changes during the long development cycle of Max Payne 3 brought severe criticism from the fan community as well as the media; UGO commented that "his suave, noir look got booted by trailer trash sensibilities" and blamed Obadiah Stane, Bam Bam Bigelow, John McClane and Kerry King for being "most responsible for Max's new style." Keith Stuart of The Guardian opined that, with the third game, Rockstar succeeded in turning "its ex-cop anti-hero into a credible character," even as there is a "slight disconnect between the shambling Max of the cinematic sequences and the athletic psychopath we control in the interactive sections."

See also
List of fictional police detectives
List of vigilantes in popular culture

References

Action film characters
Action-adventure game characters
Fictional alcohol abusers
Fictional American people in video games
Fictional bodyguards in video games
Fictional characters from New York City
Fictional characters with post-traumatic stress disorder
Fictional characters with neurological or psychological disorders
Fictional Drug Enforcement Administration personnel
Fictional gunfighters in video games
Fictional government agents
Fictional mass murderers
Fictional painkiller addicts
Fictional New York City Police Department detectives
Male characters in video games
Max Payne
Rockstar Games characters
Fictional police officers in video games
Video game characters based on real people
Video game characters introduced in 2001
Video game protagonists
Vigilante characters in video games